Farariana is a town in Madagascar. It is a part of the commune of Nandihizana in the District of Manjakandriana, and is located 35 km from the city of Antananarivo.

History
Farariana was established in the 17th century and can count among its rulers one of the sisters of Andrianampoinimerina, the king who reunited the Kingdom of Imerina at the turn of the 19th century. At the time of its founding, approximately 1000 people lived in Farariana. After World War II, numerous businessmen born in Farariana moved to Antananarivo and started lumber and woodworking businesses.

References

A. Dandouau: Geographie du Madagascar. Larose-Parution, 1992
Institut Géographique National de France: Madagascar (livre de poche). IGN, 1992
S. Woodburn Kirby: History of the Second World War. The War Against Japan, Volume II. London HMSO, 1958

Populated places in Antananarivo Province